Athous angulifrons is a species of click beetle from the family Elateridae endemic to Kamnik–Savinja Alps of Slovenia.

References

Beetles described in 1905
Endemic fauna of Slovenia
Dendrometrinae